"Nothing but Summer" is a song recorded by Canadian country rock artist Dallas Smith. It was released in April 2013 as the fifth single from his debut solo album, Jumped Right In. It peaked at number 70 on the Canadian Hot 100 in June 2013.

Critical reception
Casadie Pederson of Top Country wrote that the song "is destined to be the song of the summer." She said that "Smith’s vocals on this track are spot on and slay the tempo of the song."

Music video
The music video was directed by Stephano Barberis and premiered in May 2013.

Chart performance
"Nothing but Summer" debuted at number 80 on the Canadian Hot 100 for the week of June 15, 2013.

Certifications

References

2012 songs
2013 singles
Dallas Smith songs
604 Records singles
Songs written by Chris Tompkins
Songs written by Joe Collins (singer)
Songs written by Mark Irwin (songwriter)
Songs written by Joey Moi
Song recordings produced by Joey Moi
Music videos directed by Stephano Barberis